Eremias persica, the Aralo-Caspian racerunner or Persian racerunner, is a species of lizard native to southern Azerbaijan, most of Iran, southern Turkmenistan, Afghanistan, and western Pakistan. Eremias intermedia is also known as the Aralo-Caspian racerunner.

Taxonomy and conservation
It was described by William Thomas Blanford in 1875. The type locality is near Isfahan, Iran. The specific epithet persica refers to its distribution in Persia (now known as Iran).

Eremias nigrolateralis Rastegar-Pouyani & Nilson, 1998, the black-sided racerunner, was described based on dorsal color patterning differences but is now considered a synonym of E. persica. E. nigrolateralis was considered a species of least concern on the IUCN Red List based on its extensive, suitable habitat, large population, and presumed lack of significant threats. It was considered "unlikely to be declining fast enough to qualify for listing in a more threatened category". E. persica has not been separately assessed on the IUCN Red List.

Description
It is most closely related to Eremias velox, of which it was previously treated as a subspecies, and they share several attributes such as having a wide range distribution across the Iranian Plateau, as well as the number of and shape of their scales. It can be morphologically distinguished from E. velox based on several characteristics, including:
 continuous dorsolateral black stripes (vs. E. velox with interrupted, forming ocelli with white spots),
 the stripes strongly contrasting with the base pattern (vs. not strongly contrasting), 
 juveniles with 4 dark stripes on the back between dorsolateral white-spotted stripes (vs. 3 dark stripes), and
 juveniles with ventral surface of tail not red (vs. carmine red in E. velox).

Like many other lacertid lizards, the juveniles are more easily distinguished from other species than the adults. Other closely related species of Eremias racerunners include  E. kopetdaghica, E. isfahanica, E. lalezharica, E. montana, E. papenfussi, E. strauchi, and E. suphani.

Distribution and habitat
The Persian racerunner occurs in Iran, southern Azerbaijan, southern Turkmenistan, Afghanistan, and western Pakistan. In Iran, Eremias persica has a broad distribution in the central plateau south of the Alborz Mountains, including the Zagros Mountains, but it is absent from the central deserts Dasht-e Lut and Dasht-e Kavir. It is found in open plains and slopes, typically in areas of low vegetation and gravel surfaces. It is also found on mixed sand or silt and gravel.

References

Eremias
Reptiles of Afghanistan
Reptiles of Iran
Reptiles of Pakistan
Reptiles of Central Asia
Taxa named by William Thomas Blanford
Reptiles described in 1875
Taxobox binomials not recognized by IUCN